Frantisek Trtik competed for Czechoslovakia in the men's standing volleyball event at the 1992 Summer Paralympics, winning a bronze medal.

See also 
 Czechoslovakia at the 1992 Summer Paralympics

References

External links
 

Living people
Year of birth missing (living people)
Place of birth missing (living people)
Czechoslovak men's volleyball players
Paralympic bronze medalists for Czechoslovakia
Paralympic medalists in volleyball
Volleyball players at the 1992 Summer Paralympics
Medalists at the 1992 Summer Paralympics